The Coalition of Informal Economy Association of Swaziland (CIEAS) was formed in 2006 by marginalized community-based organizations (CBOs) striving to earn a leaving by carrying out different income-generation projects. CIEAS has a membership of 12,600 which is dominated by a 60% number of women. CIEAS has established branches in all four regions of Swaziland. 

CIEAS has a democratically elected leadership. The organization seeks to bring together all informal traders in Swaziland.

References 

Business organisations based in Eswatini
Organizations established in 2006
2006 establishments in Swaziland